The Victoriano Luna General Hospital (or simply V. Luna General Hospital), also known as Armed Forces of the Philippines Medical Center (AFP General Hospital), is one of the Armed Forces of the Philippines' Wide Support Units tasked to provide medical care to military personnel and civilian human resources of the AFP, which includes their immediate dependents. It also refers to the healthcare facility complex that is occupied by the unit along V. Luna Avenue in Pinyahan, Quezon City.

History 
The V. Luna General Hospital was named after Col. Victoriano Luna who was then Chief of the Medical Service and Adviser to the Chief of Staff. He came up with the idea in 1935 of putting up an Army Station Hospital to address the health service needs of a growing army.

By 1937, Army Engineers started the design conceptualization and construction of Luna's dream. On September 3, 1946, pursuant to Headquarters Philippine Army (HPA) GO Nr 512, the 1st Philippine Army General Hospital was named "Colonel Victoriano Luna General Hospital" in honor Luna who conceptualized the medical center.

Units 
The units under the AFPHSC control are as follows:
 Headquarters & Headquarters Service Support Group
 Victoriano Luna Medical Center
 Health Service Education and Training Center
 Public Health Service Center
 Dental Service Center
 Veterinary Service Center

References

External links 
 Official Page of the AFP Medical Center
 Official Site of the Armed Forces of the Philippines

Department of National Defense (Philippines)
Armed Forces of the Philippines
Military hospitals in the Philippines
Hospitals in Quezon City
Military facilities in Metro Manila
Buildings and structures in Quezon City